Racing Club Villalbés is a Spanish football team based in Vilalba, in the autonomous community of Galicia. Founded in 1931, it currently plays in Tercera División RFEF – Group 1, holding home matches at Estadio Municipal A Magdalena, which has a capacity of 2,000 spectators.

History
Founded on 1 November 1931 as Club Villalbés, the club only played regional football until ceasing activities in 1948. They only returned in 1953, playing for another eleven years before again going to inactivity.

In 1966, the club returned to an active status, now named Racing Club Villalbés. In 1992, they achieved their first promotion to Tercera División.

Season to season

19 seasons in Tercera División
1 season in Tercera División RFEF

External links
Official website 
Futbolme team profile 
Club history; at Terra 

Football clubs in Galicia (Spain)
Association football clubs established in 1931
1931 establishments in Spain